Maya Lasker-Wallfisch (born 1958 in London) is a psychoanalytic psychotherapist, author and educator, specialising in transgenerational trauma.

Biography 
Maya Jacobs Lasker-Wallfisch was born as Marianne Lasker-Wallfisch in London into a family of musicians. Her parents, pianist Peter Wallfisch and cellist Anita Lasker-Wallfisch OBE, were both originally from Breslau and had emigrated to Great Britain after the Second World War. Her mother is of Jewish-German descent and had survived the Holocaust as a cellist in the girls' orchestra at Auschwitz (after arriving in England, she became a co-founder of the English Chamber Orchestra). 
Maya Lasker-Wallfisch was married to David Jacobs, the son of London's Rabbi Louis Jacobs, with whom she has a son.
Her older brother is the cellist Raphael Wallfisch, her nephews are film composer and Academy member Benjamin and baritone Simon Wallfisch.

Career 
After initially working with children at the Tavistock Centre in London, Lasker-Wallfisch trained as an addiction's specialist and later became a psychoanalytic psychotherapist for adults, couples, and families. Her focus is on the treatment of transgenerational trauma. Lasker-Wallfisch lectures on the psychological and political consequences of the Nazi dictatorship. She has published scientific articles and was a speaker at the 2017 international conference on
transgenerational trauma in Amman, Jordan and at the "Celebrate Life festival" near Oldenburg, Germany. Together with her mother Anita she campaigns at numerous memorial events against anti-Semitism and for a living culture of remembrance.

Author 

In 2020 German publishing house Suhrkamp Verlag published her memoirs entitled "Letter to Breslau", in which she explores her family's history and the transgenerational transmission of trauma. In an interview with the Jewish Chronicle she describes her motivation as follows: "I longed to have three generations of Laskers in the same place, because my grandparents could never be in a room together with us. Now they have a home in my book. Though there is no cemetery to visit, I hope I’ve given them back, the Laskers of Breslau, a place to be."

Lasker-Wallfisch's biography was well received by German reviewers, with Marta Kijowska in Frankfurter Allgemeine Zeitung calling it "an impressive book. It contains an unusually open and comprehensible description of a transgenerational trauma that is still rarely addressed." Die Welt's Manuel Brug points out "with 'Letter to Breslau' Maya Lasker-Wallfisch has written a gripping family history – as well as a modern theory of memory." Deutschlandfunk’s Peter Sawicki calls it a "... touching book. Maya Lasker-Wallfisch writes with empathy and succeeds in portraying a sensitive topic in a lively manner." German public broadcasting radio Deutschlandfunk Kultur remarks "The author finds a clear and touching language to break out of the devastating silence. To tell her grandparents everything that she did not hear from her mother for so many decades.". Alexandra Senfft (Der Freitag) calls it a powerful book that has "greatly enriched the understanding of transgenerational transmission, the perspective on multiple generations in historical contexts. It reminds us of the dangerous psychological and political legacies of the Nazi dictatorship and proves that the destructive spell of the past can be broken." In April 2021 Lasker-Wallfisch's biography was chosen 'Book of the Month' by 'Haus der Heimat des Landes Baden-Württemberg' (education and research center of the Ministry of Interior of Baden-Württemberg).

On the topic of her family history Lasker-Wallfisch also curated an original stage performance, The Laskers From Breslau which she produced from the archive of family correspondence as a stage performance with live musical performances by composers such as Ernst Bloch, Max Bruch, and Maurice Ravel. This was presented at the Jewish Museum Berlin and later in Hamburg by invitation of the Shoah Foundation UCLA
In July 2020 she was invited to a talk about her book by Munich Documentation Centre for the History of National Socialism.

Lasker-Wallfisch lives and works in London and Berlin. In 2020 she received German citizenship.

The German translation of her second book "Ich schreib euch aus Berlin" (I write to you from Berlin) was published by Suhrkamp/Insel in october 2022.

References

External links 
 The Royal Society of Medicine Video of 'RSM In Conversation’ Live with Dr. Anita Lasker-Wallfisch and Maya Lasker-Wallfisch via youtube.com
 Jewish Museum Berlin The Laskers from Breslau (Wrocław) - A Family Reunion in Music and Words via youtube.com
 Jüdische Allgemeine newspaper interview by Katrin Richter, 24.2.2019  via juedische-allgemeine.de

1958 births
Living people
British psychotherapists
21st-century English writers
21st-century English women writers
People from London
English memoirists